Borom Sarret or The Wagoner is a 1963 film by Senegalese director Ousmane Sembène, the first film over which he had full control. It is often called the first film (or first narrative film) made in Africa by an African; the first "professional" African film; or the first such film to be shown widely outside of Africa. However, this is disputed, with some other films, such as Song of Khartoum, Sarzan, and Mouramani having arguably been produced earlier. Thus, some authors refer to it as "among the first" films made in Africa by an African filmmaker. Borom Sarret is 18 minutes long and tells a story about a cart driver in Dakar. The film illustrates the poverty in Africa, showing that independence has not solved the problems of its people. It was shown as part of the Cannes Classics section of the 2013 Cannes Film Festival.

Plot
Senegalese director Ousmane Sembène's Borom Sarret tells the story of a poor man trying to make a living as a cart driver in Dakar. Subtitles refer to him as "The Wagoner".

While he hopes to be paid for his services, he knows some of the passengers will not pay because they have no income or do not usually. Sometimes, all he gets is a handshake. Among his customers is a man delivering his child's body to the cemetery. When the man is not allowed in because he does not have the correct papers, the cart driver abandons the body and leaves the man lamenting over his loss. 

In another sequence, a well dressed man asks to be taken to the French quarter. The cart driver does not want to take him there because carts are not allowed there. The customer asserts that the customer's connections enable him to disregard the rule. However, they are stopped by a police man who demands the cart driver's  papers. The customer leaves without paying his fare or defending the cart driver. When the cart driver pulls out his paperwork, a medallion drops to the ground. The policeman steps on it. 

In the next scene, the cart driver has only his horse, as his cart has been confiscated in lieu of the fine. When he arrives home, the cart driver informs his wife that he has no money. His wife hands their baby to him and assures him that she will make sure they will eat and leaves the premises.

See also
 Cinema of Senegal

References

External links 
 Borom Sarret (video) at africanfilmlibrary.com
 

1963 films
1960s French-language films
Senegalese short films
Senegalese black-and-white films
Senegalese drama films
Films directed by Ousmane Sembène
Films set in Senegal
1963 directorial debut films
1963 short films